Termini is an underground station of the Rome Metro. The station was inaugurated on 10 February 1955 as a station on Line B, and later became an interchange with Line A. The station is found in Piazza dei Cinquecento, under the Termini rail terminal. Together, the two stations form the main public transport hub in the city.

Termini is currently the only station in the Rome Metro system to serve both Lines A and B.

Services 
This station has:
 Ticket office
 Escalators

Interchanges 
   Termini interchange station for Line B and Line A on the Rome Metro.
  Roma Laziali station on the Rome–Giardinetti railway.
  5 – 14 (Tram Line) – H – 38 – 40 Express – 50 Express – 64 – 66 – 70 – 75 – 82 – 90 Express – 92 – 105 – 150F – 223 – 310 – 590 – 714 – 910 – nMA – nMB – nMB1 – n5 – n8 – n11 – n46 – n66 – n70 – n92 – n98 – n543 – n716 – C2 – C3

Located nearby 
 Basilica di Santa Maria Maggiore
 Rome and Fiuggi Rail Road
 Sapienza University of Rome

References

External links 

Termini Station (in Italian).
Google satellite image

Rome Metro Line A stations
Rome Metro Line B stations
Railway stations opened in 1955
1955 establishments in Italy
Rome R. XV Esquilino
Rome R. XVIII Castro Pretorio
Railway stations in Italy opened in the 20th century